This is a list of members of the 22nd Legislative Assembly of Queensland from 1920 to 1923, as elected at the 1920 state election held on 9 October 1920.

This was the first major showing of the Country Party in the Queensland parliament. In 1923, the Northern Country Party merged with the Country Party, but its two members both defected to the Nationalists who, with two former Country Party members, formed the United Party.

  On 7 February 1922, the Labor member for Paddington, John Fihelly, resigned to take up an appointment as Agent-General for Queensland in London. The Labor candidate and former President of the Queensland Legislative Council, Alfred Jones, won the resulting by-election on 18 March 1922.
  On 5 October 1922, the Labor member for Rockhampton, Frank Forde, resigned to contest the 1922 election for the seat of Capricornia. George Farrell, the Labor candidate, won the resulting by-election on 17 February 1923.

References

 Waterson, Duncan Bruce: Biographical Register of the Queensland Parliament 1860-1929 (second edition), Sydney 2001.

See also
1920 Queensland state election
Theodore Ministry (Labor) (1919–1925)

Members of Queensland parliaments by term
20th-century Australian politicians